Alcott is a surname of English origin. At the time of the British Census of 1881, its relative frequency was highest in Herefordshire (18.2 times the British average), followed by Warwickshire, Glamorgan, Sussex, Worcestershire, Hampshire, London and Kent. In all other British counties, its relative frequency was below national average. Alcott is traditionally mainly a West Midlands name.

The name Alcott may refer to:

Amos Bronson Alcott (1799–1888), American educator and writer
Abigail May Alcott Nieriker (1840–1879), American artist and sister of Louisa May
Amy Alcott (born 1956) – American Hall of Fame golfer
Chemmy Alcott, British alpine skier
Dylan Alcott, Australian wheelchair tennis & basketball player
Louisa May Alcott (1832–1888), daughter of Amos Bronson Alcott, author of Little Women
William A. Alcott (1798–1859), author of advice books for newlyweds and cousin to Amos and Louisa

See also

Olcott (surname)

References